The Alfa Romeo Giulietta (Tipo 750 and Tipo 101, meaning "Type 750" and "Type 101") is a family of automobiles made by Italian car manufacturer Alfa Romeo from 1954 until 1965 which included a 2+2 coupé, four-door saloon, estate, spider, Sprint, and Sprint Speciale. The 2+2 was Alfa Romeo's first successful foray into the 1.3-litre class. From 1954 to 1965 a total of  177,690 Giuliettas were made, the great majority in saloon (Berlina), Sprint coupé, or Spider body styles, but also as Sprint Speciale and Sprint Zagato coupés, and the rare Promiscua estate.

The Giulietta series was succeeded by the Giulia in 1962.

History
The first Giulietta to be introduced was the Giulietta Sprint 2+2 coupé at the 1954 Turin Motor Show. Designed by Franco Scaglione at Bertone, it was produced at the coachbuilder's Grugliasco plant near Turin. Owing to overwhelming demand upon the model's introduction, the earliest Giulietta Sprints were hand-built by Alfa Romeo with bodywork made at Bertone and Ghia providing interior and electrical components. Approximately 200-1000 "pre-production" cars were made in this manner, with numerous cosmetic and mechanical differences from the later production cars built at Grugliasco.

A year later, at the Turin Motor Show in April 1955, the Sprint was joined by the 4-door saloon Berlina.
In mid 1955, the open two-seat Giulietta Spider, featuring convertible bodywork by Pinin Farina. In 1957, a more powerful Berlina version, called Giulietta T.I. (Turismo Internazionale), was presented with minor cosmetic changes to the hood, the dial lights and rear lamps.

Carrozzeria Colli also made the Giulietta station wagon variant called Giulietta Promiscua. Ninety-one examples of this version were built. Carrozzeria Boneschi also made a few station wagon examples called Weekendina.

1959 restyling

A new version of the Giulietta Berlina debuted at the Frankfurt Motor Show in 1959. Mechanical changes were limited to shifting the fuel pump from the cylinder head to a lower position below the distributor, and moving the previously exposed fuel filler cap from the tail to the right rear wing, under a flap. The bodywork showed a revised front end, with more rounded wings, recessed head lights, and new grilles with chrome frames and two horizontal bars. The rear also showed changes, with new larger tail lights on vestigial fins, which replaced the earlier rounded rear wings. The interior was much more organized and upholstered in new cloth material; the redesigned dashboard included a strip speedometer flanked by two round bezels, that on the T.I. housed a tachometer and oil and water temperature gauges. The T.I. also received a front side repeater mounted in a small spear, unlike the Normale which kept the earlier small round lamp with no decorations. During 1959 the type designation for all models was changed from 750 and 753 to 101.

In February 1961 the 100,001st Giulietta rolled off the Portello factory, with a celebration sponsored by Italian actress Giulietta Masina.

1961 restyling

In Autumn 1961 the Giulietta was updated a second time. With this new engine the car could reach a speed of almost . At the front of the car square mesh side grilles were now pieced together with the centre shield, and at the rear there were larger tail lights. Inside the T.I. had individual instead of bench seats, with storage nets on the seatbacks.

June 1962 saw the introduction of the Alfa Romeo Giulia, which would eventually replace the Giulietta. As until 1964 the Giulia only had a larger 1.6-litre engine, production of the standard Berlina ended with 1963, whilst the T.I. continued for a full year more. A last T.I. was completed in 1965.
The Giulietta sport models had a different fate: Sprint, Sprint Speciale and Spider were fitted with the new 1.6-litre engine, received some updates and continued to be sold under the Giulia name until they were replaced by all-new Giulia-based models during 1965.

Specifications

The Alfa Romeo Giulietta used unibody construction and a front-engine, rear-wheel-drive layout. Front suspension was by control arms, with coaxial coil springs and hydraulic dampers. At the rear there was a solid axle on coil springs and hydraulic dampers. The axle was located by a longitudinal link on each side, and by a wishbone-shaped arm linking the top of the aluminium differential housing to the chassis. All Giuliettas (save for the last SZ examples) had hydraulic drum brakes on all four corners.
When leaving the Portello factory it originally fitted Pirelli Cinturato 155 HR15 tyres (CA67).

Engines
The Giulietta used an Alfa Romeo Twin Cam straight-four of 1290 cc, with an aluminium alloy engine block and cast iron inserted sleeves. The aluminium alloy cylinder head was of a crossflow design and featured hemispherical combustion chambers. The double overhead camshafts were driven by two timing chains, and acted on two valves per cylinder, angled 80°.

Models

Giulietta Sprint Speciale

The Alfa Romeo Giulietta Sprint Speciale (also called as Giulietta SS, officially called Tipo 101.20, Italian for "Type 101.20") was an aerodynamic 2-door, 2-seat coupé designed by Franco Scaglione at Bertone. 1.366 were made from 1957 to 1962. The car had a steel body, and was based on a short-wheelbase Giulietta chassis. It used a 1.3-litre engine brought to  thanks to double twin-choke carburettors and a high compression ratio.

Giulietta Sprint Zagato

The Alfa Romeo Giulietta SZ (for Sprint Zagato, officially the Tipo 101.26, or "Type 101.26") was an aluminium-bodied 2-seater berlinetta, built by Zagato for competition use on the chassis and mechanicals of the Sprint Speciale.

A crashed Sprint Veloce was rebodied by Zagato in late 1956, and was immediately successful in competition. Zagato ended up building 18 rebodied Veloces, called the SVZ and the version gave rise to a full production version. The SVZ was about  lighter than the Coupé on which it was based, and had the highest tuned,  version of the Giulietta engine.

A production competition version of the Giulietta, with lightened bodywork designed by Ercole Spada at Zagato was then premiered at the 1960 Geneve Salon. Handbuilt by Zagato, entirely in aluminium and with plexiglass windows, the lightened Sprint Zagato (SZ) was light, fast, and expensive. Two hundred seventeen were built, the original design with a rounded rear and with the last thirty (some say 46) receiving a longer kamm-style rear end as well as disc brakes up front. The original design is called the "Coda Tonda" (round tail), while the Kamm-design is referred to as the "Coda Tronca" (truncated tail). The Coda Tronca is sometimes also referred to as the "SZ2". The first examples were built in December 1959, and production continued into 1962. Zagato also rebodied a few existing cars with this bodywork, leading to discrepancies in the production numbers.

The SZ was very successful in racing, on a national level as well as internationally. The SZ helped Alfa Romeo secure a victory in the 1.3 litre class of the International Championship for GT Manufacturers in 1962 and 1963.
Michel Nicol won the Tour de Corse in 1957.

Production

Overall production figures were:

Berlina 	39,057
TI 	        92,728
Sprint 	24,084
Sprint Veloce 	3,058
Spider 	14,300
Spider Veloce 	2,796
Promiscua (wagon)  91

See also
 Alfa Romeo Giulietta Sprint Speciale

Notes

References

Further reading

External links

 Alfa Romeo Giulietta Register

Giulietta
Rear-wheel-drive vehicles
Sports sedans
Coupés
Bertone vehicles
Roadsters
Cars introduced in 1954
24 Hours of Le Mans race cars
Rally cars
1960s cars